Farid Madsoh is a Thai footballer who plays for Thai League 3 club Kasem Bundit University as a midfielder.

References

External links

Living people
1987 births
Farid Madsoh
Farid Madsoh
Farid Madsoh
Farid Madsoh
Association football midfielders